"Medicine" is a standalone song by the English rock band the 1975, released on 31 October 2014 for the 2014 Drive re-release. It was written, produced and performed by members Matthew Healy and George Daniel.

Background and release
The song was written and produced by Matty Healy and George Daniel, and it was only performed by them as well. Healy stated: "We wrote Medicine for our chosen scenes. Medicine, its title and sentiment, goes all the way back to the original the 1975 project that was based in my bedroom. It's a new piece of music informed by the genesis of our band and our love for 'Drive' as a film. ... The movie itself plays with the duality of resignment and hope - and this is most obvious and stirring in the scenes we chose to score. The song is a testament to that same idea and has in turn become one of our most personal and best loved pieces of music to date."It was premiered on BBC Radio 1 at 7:30 pm on 30 October 2014, a few hours before Drive was shown on BBC Three. The single was released to iTunes as a digital download the next day.

Track listing

Charts

References

2014 singles
2014 songs
Songs written by Matthew Healy
The 1975 songs